The governor of Lanao del Norte, is the chief executive of the provincial government of Lanao del Norte.

Provincial Governors (1959-2025)

References

Governors of Lanao del Norte
Lanao del Norte